Songs the Night Sings is the second studio album by the Finnish heavy metal band the Dark Element. It was released on November 8, 2019 through Frontiers Records.

Track listing

References

2019 albums
Frontiers Records albums